The A13 (before 2011 also known as P393) is a national highway in the northern part of Kazakhstan, that connects Kokshetau with Kazakhstan's border with Russia. After crossing the border with Russia, the highway continues to Omsk as P393.

Since Soviet times it has sometimes been called Kokshetau — Omsk Highway. Today the highway stretches through two regions and ends at the Bidaik border checkpoint.

History 
Until 2011, the A-13 route was designated as P393.

General data
 Length:

Route description
The A13 would go through the Kokshetau, Akmola and North Kazakhstan regions, running pass the districts of Zerendi, Taiynsha, Akzhar and Ualikhanov (Kishkenekol).

Attractions
Kokshetau is a city with a population of 146 thousand inhabitants, located on the north of Kokshetau hills, on the southern shores of Lake Kopa and the southern edge of the Esil (Ishim) Steppe.

References

External links
 KAZ A-13 highway (Kazakhstan)

Roads in Kazakhstan
Central Asian highways